Tater Tot & Patton is a 2017 American drama film written and directed by Andrew Kightlinger. The film stars Jessica Rothe, Bates Wilder, and Forrest Weber.

It was released on June 9, 2017 by Giant Pictures.

Premise 
A wayward millennial escapes to a South Dakota ranch, unhinging her Uncle's placid alcoholic life.

Cast 

 Jessica Rothe as Andie
 Bates Wilder as Erwin
 Forrest Weber as Richie
 Kathy Askew as Tilly

Release 
The film was released on June 9, 2017 by Giant Pictures.

Reception 
On review aggregator website Rotten Tomatoes, the film holds an approval rating of 86% based on 21 critic reviews, with an average rating of 6.51/10. James Hanton of Outtake Mag scored the film a 4/5 and stated "A film executed with great conviction and a staggering attention to detail, Tater Tot & Patton strikes the perfect balance between relatable and extraordinary." Movie Nation's Roger Moore rated the film 2.5/4 and said "A vivid sense of place – South Dakota – and a winning, subtle turn by Jessica Rothe are the strong suit of this character dramedy."

References

External links 

 Tater Tot & Patton on IMDb

2017 films
2017 drama films
American drama films
2010s English-language films
2010s American films